Andrew Robert Fickett (born December 14, 1979) is an American mixed martial artist who competes in the Lightweight division. A professional competitor since 1999, Fickett has also formerly competed for the UFC, Strikeforce, DREAM, Cage Rage, the XFC, MFC, and King of the Cage.

Background
Fickett is from Tucson, Arizona and began training in Kajukenbo when he was 10 years old. When Fickett was in high school he was a Wrestler and practiced Judo, with MMA legend Don Frye's original trainer. He was the second best wrestler in the state of Arizona during his junior year and began his career in MMA shortly after graduating from high school. After his college wrestling career at Pima Community College was ended prematurely due to a serious motorcycle accident, Fickett dropped out of college and moved to live in Phoenix, Arizona for two years to become trained as a mixed martial artist.

Mixed martial arts career

Early career
Fickett began his professional MMA career in 1999 and quickly amassed an undefeated record of 12–0 in the first 20 months of his career.  Before entering the UFC, Fickett had a record of 24–2 with notable wins over Dennis Hallman, Carlo Prater and Kenny Florian.

Ultimate Fighting championship
UFC President, Dana White stated that Fickett was originally supposed to be a contestant on the first season of The Ultimate Fighter, but upon watching his bout with Kenny Florian at a small mixed martial arts event, he had decided to sign Florian onto the show in his place.  Fickett defeated Florian, but shortly after was incarcerated. White then went with Florian.

Fickett made his Ultimate Fighting Championship debut in February 2005 at UFC 51, losing to Nick Diaz via TKO.  He went 4–3 in his tenure with the organization, with notable victories over Kurt Pellegrino, Josh Neer and a come-from-behind win over Josh Koscheck.

Post-UFC
Following his release from the UFC in 2007, Fickett stayed busy fighting for a number of smaller tier promotions including HDNet Fights, Cage Rage and Strikeforce.

Fickett had been scheduled to fight Ryan Ford for the Maximum Fighting Championship welterweight title at MFC 17: Hostile Takeover on July 25, 2008. However, after signing an agreement for the MFC fight, he signed another agreement to fight Luke Stewart at the Strikeforce: Melendez vs. Thomson event on June 27, 2008, as a replacement for an injured Joe Riggs. This placed him in breach of his agreement with MFC, which stated that he would not fight for five weeks prior to his MFC date. As a result, he ended up being removed from both fight cards, and MFC president/owner Mark Pavelich declared that Fickett would never again fight in the MFC.

From August 2008 to August 2009, Fickett suffered the worst year of his professional career, with only 2 wins versus 8 losses.  Fickett later revealed in interviews that he had not even trained for these fights.

Fickett returned in 2010 with a renewed focus. He defeated fellow UFC veteran Derrick Noble by submission, ending his 5 fight losing streak. In September 2010, he won the one night Shine: Lightweight Grand Prix which saw him fight three times over the course of the evening. He ended all of the fights in the first round via submission and declared, "I'm back" in his post-fight interview.

Maximum Fighting Championship
Fickett then signed a multi-fight contract with the Maximum Fighting Championship. His first fight was against Matt Veach at MFC 28 on February 25, 2011. He won via submission in the first round. MFC announced his release from the organization following his loss to Tatsuya Kawajiri.

Independent Circuit
Fickett faced Luis Felix at CES MMA 22 on March 14, 2014. He lost by KO (head kick) in the second round.

Mixed martial arts record

|-
| Loss
| align=center| 42–21
| Luis Felix
| KO (head kick)
| Classic Entertainment and Sports MMA 22
| 
| align=center| 2
| align=center| 2:29
| Lincoln, Rhode Island, United States
| 
|-
| Loss
| align=center| 42–20
| Andre Winner
| Decision (unanimous)
| Global Warrior Challenge: The British Invasion: US vs. UK
| 
| align=center| 3
| align=center| 5:00
| Kansas City, Missouri, United States
| 
|-
| Loss
| align=center| 42–19
| Justin Gaethje
| KO (punches)
| Rage in the Cage 163
| 
| align=center| 1
| align=center| 0:12
| Chandler, Arizona, United States
| 
|-
| Loss
| align=center| 42–18
| Jonatas Novaes
| TKO (head kick and punches)
| ShoFight 20
| 
| align=center| 1
| align=center| 0:51
| Springfield, Missouri, United States
| 
|-
| Win
| align=center| 42–17
| Kevin Knabjian
| Submission (guillotine choke)
| Worldwide MMA 1: McCorkle vs. Heden
| 
| align=center| 1
| align=center| 3:38
| El Paso, Texas, United States
| 
|-
| Loss
| align=center| 41–17
| Jamie Varner
| TKO (Submission to punches)
| Xtreme FC 16: High Stakes
| 
| align=center| 1
| align=center| 0:40
| Knoxville, Tennessee, United States
| 
|-
| Loss
| align=center| 41–16
| Ronys Torres
| TKO (Submission to punches)
| Amazon Forest Combat 1
| 
| align=center| 1
| align=center| 0:47
| Manaus, Brazil
| 
|-
| Loss
| align=center| 41–15
| Tatsuya Kawajiri
| TKO (punches)
| Dream: Japan GP Final
| 
| align=center| 1
| align=center| 4:41
| Tokyo, Japan
| 
|-
| Loss
| align=center| 41–14
| Brian Cobb
| TKO (punches)
| MFC 30
| 
| align=center| 1
| align=center| 4:44
| Edmonton, Alberta, Canada
| 
|-
| Win
| align=center| 41–13
| Matt Veach
| Submission (armbar)
| MFC 28
| 
| align=center| 1
| align=center| 0:36
| Edmonton, Alberta, Canada
| Catchweight bout (160 lbs)
|-
| Win
| align=center| 40–13
| Carlo Prater
| Submission (rear-naked choke)
| Shine Fights 3: Lightweight Grand Prix
| 
| align=center| 1
| align=center| 2:02
| Newkirk, Oklahoma, United States
| Tournament Final
|-
| Win
| align=center| 39–13
| Dennis Bermudez
| Submission (rear-naked choke)
| Shine Fights 3: Lightweight Grand Prix
| 
| align=center| 1
| align=center| 2:02
| Newkirk, Oklahoma, United States
| Semi Final
|-
| Win
| align=center| 38–13
| Charles Bennett
| Submission (guillotine choke)
| Shine Fights 3: Lightweight Grand Prix
| 
| align=center| 1
| align=center| 4:25
| Newkirk, Oklahoma, United States
| Quarter Final
|-
| Win
| align=center| 37–13
| Derrick Noble
| Submission (rear-naked choke)
| Cage Fighting Extreme/XKL: Mayhem in Minneapolis
| 
| align=center| 2
| align=center| 1:09
| Minneapolis, Minnesota, United States
| 
|-
| Loss
| align=center| 36–13
| Freddy Sandoval
| KO (knee)
| Rage In The Cage 133
| 
| align=center| 1
| align=center| 0:28
| New Mexico, United States
| 
|-
| Loss
| align=center| 36–12
| Kyle Baker
| TKO (punches)
| Cagefest Xtreme: All In
| 
| align=center| 1
| align=center| 1:47
| Virginia, United States
| 
|-
| Loss
| align=center| 36–11
| Nik Lentz
| Decision (unanimous)
| Extreme Beatdown: Beatdown at 4 Bears 4
| 
| align=center| 3
| align=center| 5:00
| North Dakota, United States
| Lightweight debut
|-
| Loss
| align=center| 36–10
| Tyler Stinson
| TKO (punches)
| C3 Fights
| 
| align=center| 1
| align=center| 4:04
| Oklahoma, United States
| 
|-
| Loss
| align=center| 36–9
| Ferrid Kheder
| KO (punches)
| C3 Fights: Knock Out Rock Out Weekend 1
| 
| align=center| 3
| align=center| 2:02
| Oklahoma, United States
| 
|-
| Win
| align=center| 36–8
| Jason MacKay
| Submission (triangle choke)
| Phoenix Fight Promotions: Wanted
| 
| align=center| 1
| align=center| 3:25
| Nova Scotia, Canada
| Catchweight bout (160 lbs)
|-
| Loss
| align=center| 35–8
| Jose Cortez
| Decision (split)
| Rage in the Cage 117
| 
| align=center| 3
| align=center| 5:00
| Arizona, United States
| Catchweight bout (175 lbs)
|-
| Loss
| align=center| 35–7
| Jesse Taylor
| TKO (punches)
| Total Combat 32
| 
| align=center| 1
| align=center| 1:42
| California, United States
| 
|-
| Win
| align=center| 35–6
| Joe Manzello
| Submission (rear-naked choke)
| Silver Crown Fights
| 
| align=center| 1
| align=center| 1:42
| Indiana, United States
| 
|-
| Loss
| align=center| 34–6
| Richard Villes
| TKO (punch to the body)
| Rage in the Cage 113
| 
| align=center| 2
| align=center| 0:34
| Arizona, United States
| 
|-
| Win
| align=center| 34–5
| Jeff Horlacher
| Submission (guillotine choke)
| Rage in the Cage 111
| 
| align=center| 1
| align=center| 2:13
| Arizona, United States
| 
|-
| Win
| align=center| 33–5
| Lim Jae-Suk
| Submission (guillotine choke)
| Strikeforce: Shamrock vs. Le
| 
| align=center| 1
| align=center| 1:14
| California, United States
| 
|-
| Win
| align=center| 32–5
| Mark Weir
| Submission (rear-naked choke)
| Cage Rage 24
| 
| align=center| 1
| align=center| 3:55
| London, England, U.K.
| 
|-
| Win
| align=center| 31–5
| Anthony Lapsley
| Submission (rear-naked choke)
| HDNet Fights 1
| 
| align=center| 1
| align=center| 3:55
| Texas, United States
| 
|-
| Win
| align=center| 30–5
| Keita Nakamura
| Decision (unanimous)
| UFC Fight Night: Stevenson vs. Guillard
| 
| align=center| 3
| align=center| 5:00
| Nevada, United States
| 
|-
| Loss
| align=center| 29–5
| Karo Parisyan
| Decision (unanimous)
| UFC Fight Night: Sanchez vs. Riggs
| 
| align=center| 3
| align=center| 5:00
| California, United States
| 
|-
| Win
| align=center| 29–4
| Kurt Pellegrino
| Submission (rear-naked choke)
| UFC 61: Bitter Rivals
| 
| align=center| 3
| align=center| 1:20
| Nevada, United States
| 
|-
| Loss
| align=center| 28–4
| Joshua Burkman
| Submission (guillotine choke)
| UFC Fight Night 3
| 
| align=center| 1
| align=center| 1:07
| Nevada, United States
| 
|-
| Win
| align=center| 28–3
| Josh Koscheck
| Submission (rear-naked choke)
| UFC Ultimate Fight Night 2
| 
| align=center| 3
| align=center| 4:28
| Nevada, United States
| 
|-
| Win
| align=center| 27–3
| Josh Neer
| Submission (rear-naked choke)
| UFC Ultimate Fight Night
| 
| align=center| 1
| align=center| 1:35
| Nevada, United States
| 
|-
| Win
| align=center| 26–3
| Brandon Melendez
| Submission (rear-naked choke)
| Ring of Fire 17: Unstoppable
| 
| align=center| 1
| align=center| 2:27
| Colorado, United States
| 
|-
| Win
| align=center| 25–3
| Robert Briggs
| TKO (corner stoppage)
| Night of Champions
| 
| align=center| 1
| align=center| 3:00
| Arizona, United States
| 
|-
| Loss
| align=center| 24–3
| Nick Diaz
| TKO (punches)
| UFC 51
| 
| align=center| 1
| align=center| 4:55
| Nevada, United States
| 
|-
| Win
| align=center| 24–2
| Nuri Shakir
| Submission
| Combat Zone 9: Hot Like Fire
| 
| align=center| 2
| align=center| 3:26
| Massachusetts, United States
| 
|-
| Win
| align=center| 23–2
| Kenny Florian
| Decision (Split)
| Combat Zone 7: Gravel Pit
| 
| align=center| 3
| align=center| 5:00
| Massachusetts, United States
| 
|-
| Win
| align=center| 22–2
| Kyle Brees
| TKO (punches)
| Xtreme Cage Fighter 5: Evolution
| 
| align=center| 2
| 
| Arizona, United States
| 
|-
| Win
| align=center| 21–2
| Fabio Holanda
| Submission (rear-naked choke)
| World Freestyle Fighting 6
| 
| align=center| 2
| align=center| 0:37
| British Columbia, Canada
| 
|-
| Win
| align=center| 20–2
| Shaun Beckett
| Submission (rear-naked choke)
| Rage on the River
| 
| align=center| 2
| align=center| 1:10
| California, United States
| 
|-
| Win
| align=center| 19–2
| Carlo Prater
| Submission (guillotine choke)
| Rage on the River
| 
| align=center| 3
| align=center| 2:25
| California, United States
| 
|-
| Win
| align=center| 18–2
| Greg Bell
| Submission (choke)
| Rage in the Cage 56
| 
| align=center| 3
| align=center| 2:43
| Arizona, United States
| 
|-
| Win
| align=center| 17–2
| Dennis Hallman
| Decision (split)
| KOTC 28: More Punishment
| 
| align=center| 3
| align=center| 5:00
| Nevada, United States
| 
|-
| Loss
| align=center| 16–2
| Landon Showalter
| Submission (triangle choke)
| United Full Contact Federation: Summer Slam
| 
| align=center| 1
| align=center| 3:00
| Washington, United States
| 
|-
| Win
| align=center| 16–1
| Shaun Beckett
| Submission (choke)
| Rage in the Cage 49: Stare Down
| 
| align=center| 2
| align=center| 2:55
| Arizona, United States
| 
|-
| Win
| align=center| 15–1
| John Lansing
| Decision (unanimous)
| Rage in the Cage 43: The Match
| 
| align=center| 3
| align=center| 3:00
| Arizona, United States
| 
|-
| Win
| align=center| 14–1
| Edwin Dewees
| Decision
| Rage in the Cage 36: The Rematch
| 
| align=center| 3
| align=center| 3:00
| Arizona, United States
| 
|-
| Win
| align=center| 13–1
| John Lansing
| Submission (armbar)
| Rage in the Cage 35: This Time It's Personal
| 
| align=center| 2
| align=center| 2:34
| Arizona, United States
| 
|-
| Loss
| align=center| 12–1
| Edwin Dewees
| Decision (split)
| Rage in the Cage 34
| 
| align=center| 3
| align=center| 3:00
| Arizona, United States
| 
|-
| Win
| align=center| 12–0
| Kimo Stant
| Submission (armbar)
| Rage in the Cage 23
| 
| align=center| 1
| align=center| 1:07
| Arizona, United States
| 
|-
| Win
| align=center| 11–0
| Maurice Wilson
| Submission (rear-naked choke)
| Cajan Fights
| 
| align=center| 1
| align=center| 3:59
| 
| 
|-
| Win
| align=center| 10–0
| Rock Lima
| Submission (choke)
| Rage in the Cage: Tucson 5
| 
| align=center| 1
| align=center| 0:28
| Arizona, United States
| 
|-
| Win
| align=center| 9–0
| Jerry Parsons
| Submission (choke)
| Rage in the Cage 22
| 
| align=center| 1
| align=center| 2:05
| Arizona, United States
| 
|-
| Win
| align=center| 8–0
| Cedric Marks
| Decision (unanimous)
| Absolute Fighter Challenge
| 
| align=center| 3
| align=center| 5:00
| Arizona, United States
| 
|-
| Win
| align=center| 7–0
| Michael Chavez
| TKO (submission to punches)
| Rage in the Cage 21
| 
| align=center| 1
| align=center| 0:57
| Arizona, United States
| 
|-
| Win
| align=center| 6–0
| Ryan Brown
| KO
| Rage in the Cage: Tucson 4
| 
| align=center| 1
| align=center| 1:16
| Arizona, United States
| 
|-
| Win
| align=center| 5–0
| Bill Cameron
| Decision
| Rage in the Cage 19
| 
| align=center| 3
| align=center| 3:00
| Arizona, United States
| 
|-
| Win
| align=center| 4–0
| Jeff Horlacher
| Submission (choke)
| Rage in the Cage 18
| 
| align=center| 1
| align=center| 1:58
| Arizona, United States
| 
|-
| Win
| align=center| 3–0
| Owen Phelps
| Submission (choke)
| Rage in the Cage: Tucson 1
| 
| align=center| 2
| align=center| 1:30
| Arizona, United States
| 
|-
| Win
| align=center| 2–0
| Jamie Clark
| Submission (choke)
| Rage in the Cage 16
| 
| align=center| 1
| align=center| 1:30
| Arizona, United States
| 
|-
| Win
| align=center| 1–0
| Shawn Polso
| Decision
| Rage in the Cage 4
| 
| align=center| 3
| align=center| 3:00
| Arizona, United States
|

References

External links
 Personal website
 

 

American male mixed martial artists
Mixed martial artists from Arizona
Mixed martial artists from Florida
Welterweight mixed martial artists
Mixed martial artists utilizing karate
Mixed martial artists utilizing judo
Mixed martial artists utilizing collegiate wrestling
Mixed martial artists utilizing Brazilian jiu-jitsu
Sportspeople from Tucson, Arizona
1979 births
Living people
Sportspeople from Tampa, Florida
Ultimate Fighting Championship male fighters
American male karateka
American male judoka
American practitioners of Brazilian jiu-jitsu
People awarded a black belt in Brazilian jiu-jitsu